Fudbalski klub Laktaši (Serbian Cyrillic: Фудбалски клуб Лакташи) is a football club based in the town of Laktaši, Republika Srpska, Bosnia and Herzegovina. It competes in the Second League of Republika Srpska.

The club was founded on 16 June 1974, in order to replace former LSK (Laktaški Sportski Klub). They play their matches on Gradski stadium, which capacity is 3,500 seats. Team colors are blue and white-blue.

The club's biggest success was winning the First League of the Republika Srpska in the season 2006–07 and promotion to Premier League of Bosnia and Herzegovina.

Club history

Origins and early years (1958–1968)
The club was founded in 1958. Football was the favorite free-time activity of local inhabitants. Miloš Vrančić and Branko Banjac, two football passionates, came up with an idea to form a football club in the town. On 30 August 1958, the constituent assembly was held and new football club was created. It got the name LSK (Laktaški sportski klub) and it was founded on the initiative of FK Partizan.

First generation of players of LSK was formed by: Miloš Vrančić, Branko Jakovljević, Jovo Malešević, Slobodan Trninić, Miroslav Vrančić, Nenad Trninić, Nebojša Popović, Miloš Sajić, Vlatko Misija and Vlado Vranješ.

First match ever played was against FK Sloga at home and ended 4–4.

In 1968 due to the fact that most of the town's youth was going to study in universities throughout the country, the club was dissolved.

Rebirth in 1974
The meeting of Tomislav Davidović and Branko Banjac, was decisive in reforming the club.
Other persons that gave their contribution to this goal were Mladen Srdić and Munib Ganibegović, who helped preparing the administration and all necessary documentation.

Đuro Malešević wrote the first Regulations and Statute.

The Renewing Board assembly was held on 17 June 1974. First Executive Council members to be elected were Miljo Samardžić, Duško Knežević, Srboljub Jeftić, Đuro Malešević and Branko Banjac.
It was decided that new football club get the name FK Laktaši (Fudbalski Klub Laktaši).

Era of Dušan Tatić
After 1974, the club has been improving year after year. They have started playing in the lowest leagues. Consolidation among the players and board members can be attributed to successful manager Dušan Tatić. Led by him, club managed to reach Intermunicipal and Regional leagues of SR Bosnia and Herzegovina.

The Football Association of Republika Srpska
The association was formed on 5 September 1992 by Bosnian Serbs who had declared independence from Bosnia and Herzegovina. Afterwards, FK Laktaši were clustered into Second league – Group Banjaluka. In 2000, due to reorganization of the Association, the club was transferred into the Third league of Republika Srpska.

Golden era (2003–2008)
In the season 2002–03, under Vlado Jagodić, club won the Third league and joined the Second League of the Republika Srpska.
Jagodić walked through the Second league in the 2003–04 season and got promoted to the First League of Republika Srpska.
The club was finishing as middle-placed until the season 2006–07 when Jagodić led the team to become the champions of Republika Srpska for the first time in club history and got promoted to Premier League of Bosnia and Herzegovina, the highest football competition in the country.

Premier League of Bosnia and Herzegovina (2007–2010)

2007–08
In season 2007–08, long-awaited journey could begin. Inspired and well motivated, FK Laktaši played their first match in Sarajevo, against FK Slavija and went home with 0–0 whereas in the second and first home match in new competition, they won NK Travnik 3:1. Vlado Jagodić was given a sack during the winter break as he could not get along with board despite the great results. Laktaši also reached the 1/4 Finals of the Cup. At the end of season, team was in the middle of league table. Undoubtedly, the best player in this year was legendary striker Dragan Gošić.

2008–09
In 2008–09, club continued to perform well. Surprisingly, at half-season they were third-placed. Despite the change of coach during the winter, club managed to finish the league on 8th position. The biggest win that year was 4–0 at home against NK Čelik and glorious moment was defeating local rivals FK Borac 1–0 away.

2009–10
First months of the 2009–10 season were fatal. In 15 matches Laktaši won only 8 points. Great turnover happened in January. Slobodan Komljenović, former FR Yugoslavia international, along with other managers and German coach Thomas Geist, took over the club. Afterwards, many great players such as Vladan Grujić, former Bosnian international, signed for the club in order to work alongside Komljenović and to help the club avoiding relegation. Legendary coach Dragoslav Stepanović came to Laktaši to work as a manager as he was in family relations with Komljenović. Unfortunately, that was not enough. Although team was playing great, at the end they finished on 15th position with 31 points, 1 point away from salvation.

Supporters
Laktaši supporters Čarobnjaci (Wizards) were formed in the 21st century. The nickname itself was given by one of the club legends, Goran Injac. The fans played an important role in 2006/2007 season when players won the First league of the Republika Srpska and got promoted to Premier league of Bosnia and Herzegovina. Their leader is Ranko Berić. Since the 2009/2010 season, this fan group no longer gather as they boycott board politics.

Honours

Domestic

League
First League of the Republika Srpska:
 Winners (1): 2006–07
Second League of the Republika Srpska
 Winners (1): 2003–04 
Third League of the Republika Srpska
 Winners (1): 2002–03

Notable former players
For a list of current and former players with Wikipedia article, please see :Category:FK Laktaši players.

Managers
 Vlado Jagodić (January 2003–January 2008)
 Zoran Ćurguz (January 2008–August 2008)
 Slobodan Kustudić (August 2008–October 2008)
 Čedomir Đoinčević (October 2008–December 2008)
 Lazo Jovanić (January 2009–2009)
 Milan Milanović (June 2009–November 2009)
 Dragoslav Stepanović (March 2010–June 2010)
 Zdravko Gajić (2010–2011)
 Miloš Pojić (2011–2012)
 Predrag Tatić (2012–2014)
 Miloš Pojić (March 2014–February 2015)
 Miodrag Petković (February 2015–September 2016)
 Miljan Bajić (September 2016–June 2019)
 Željko Vranješ (June 2019–February 2020)
 Vlado Jagodić (February 2020–March 2020)
 Darko Maletić (July 2020–December 2020)
 Miljan Bajić (January 2021–)

External links
 Official Website
 FK Laktaši old official website
 FK Laktaši at UEFA.COM
 FK Laktaši at EUFO.DE
 FK Laktaši at Weltfussball.de

Association football clubs established in 1974
Football clubs in Republika Srpska
Football clubs in Bosnia and Herzegovina
1974 establishments in Bosnia and Herzegovina
FK Laktaši